Hefei Luogang Airport is a general aviation airport serving Hefei, the capital of Anhui province, China.  Opened in November 1977, it served as Hefei's main airport until it was replaced by the new Hefei Xinqiao International Airport on 30 May 2013. In 2018, the airport was renamed "合肥骆岗通用机场" (Hefei Luogang General-Purpose Airport) to serve helicopter and other low-flying aircraft.

See also
List of airports in China
List of the busiest airports in China

References

Defunct airports in China
Airports established in 1977
Airports disestablished in 2013
1977 establishments in China
2013 disestablishments in China
Airports in Anhui
Transport in Hefei